The 1974 Montana Grizzlies football team was an American football team that represented the University of Montana in the Big Sky Conference during the 1974 NCAA Division II football season. In their eighth year under head coach Jack Swarthout, the team compiled a 3–6–1 record, (2–3–1 in Big Sky, fourth).

Schedule

References

Montana
Montana Grizzlies football seasons
Montana Grizzlies football